American Gun is a 2002 drama film written and directed by Alan Jacobs. It stars James Coburn (in his final film role), Virginia Madsen, Barbara Bain and Alexandra Holden.

Plot 
Martin Tillman (James Coburn), a World War II veteran, is on a cross-country journey to trace the origin of the gun used to kill his daughter Penny (Virginia Madsen). On the way, he seeks his granddaughter Mia (Alexandra Holden).

Writer/director Alan Jacobs was inspired by a visit to the Smith & Wesson factory in Massachusetts, where he saw an obituary for a young girl above the workbench where a man was assembling guns. He wondered if the worker had perhaps assembled the gun that killed the girl. "At that moment it clicked," Jacobs said. "I had recently read a book called Lethal Passage by the journalist Erik Larson who tracked down the history of a submachine gun that ended up in the hands of a kid who took it to school one day. That put the idea in my head that a gun could have a history."

Cast
 James Coburn as Martin Tillman
Ryan Locke as Young Man Martin Tillman
Chapin Long as Young Boy Martin Tillman
 Virginia Madsen as Penny Tillman
 Barbara Bain as Anne Tillman
Niesha Trout as Young Anne Tillman
 Alexandra Holden as Mia
Devin Irish as Young Mia
Sarah Michael Ezzo as Baby Mia
 Paula Murad Coburn as Jasmine
 Jesse Pennington as Pastor
 Jason Winther as Mike
 Alex Feldman as McNee
 Martin Kove as Theodore Huntley
 Walter Emanuel Jones as J.B.
 Andrea C. Pearson as Jewel
 Anthony Harrell as Kyle
 Toby Smith as Valerie
 Antoni Corone as Charles Anderson
 Joey Diaz as Gun Smuggler
 Laurie O'Brien as Martin's Mother
 Max Thayer as Martin's Grandfather
 Michael Esper as Burglar
 Bob Glazier as Dirty Cop
 Stacey Alexander as Vegas Show Girl #1
 Erica Arnold as Vegas Show Girl #2
 Erika Cossio as Vegas Show Girl #3
 Danielle Della Valle as Vegas Show Girl #4
 Julia Hayes as Vegas Show Girl #5
 Farrah Hines as Vegas Show Girl #6
 Tammy Kinney as Vegas Show Girl #7
 Shannon Warf as Vegas Show Girl #8

Production 
The film was shot over a period of 40 days of principal photography which began in December, 2000 in Rutland, Vermont, followed by Los Angeles, California, Las Vegas, Nevada and Miami, Florida. The film was shot by cinematographer Phil Parmet in 35mm Kodak color, black & white, with additional footage on Sony PD150 mini-DV, and the combination of formats won the Modern Digital Cinematography Award at the Seattle Independent Film Festival in 2002.

Reception 
On Rotten Tomatoes, the film holds an approval rating of 40% based on 20 reviews. Critics generally praised Coburn's lead role, with Andrew Wright of The Portland Mercury writing, "Coburn is the whole show [here]."
Jacobs' directing and screenplay drew a variety of reactions. David Hunter of The Hollywood Reporter wrote that Jacobs was "getting a lot of quality cinema out of a tight budget" and praised the "risky" storytelling, while David Nusair at Reel Film Reviews called it a "mostly engaging and intriguing character study". However, Chris Hewitt of the St. Paul Pioneer Press criticized the film's "anti-gun message, warm family drama … and its fake-out structure."

References

External links 
 

2002 drama films
2000s English-language films
American drama films
2002 films
Films directed by Alan Jacobs
American nonlinear narrative films
American independent films
Films scored by Anthony Marinelli
Filicide in fiction
2002 independent films
2000s American films